This is a list of singles which have reached number one on the Irish Singles Chart in 1985.

26 Number Ones
Most weeks at No.1 (song): "I Know Him so Well" - Elaine Paige and Barbara Dickson (5)
Most weeks at No.1 (artist): Elaine Paige and Barbara Dickson (5)
Most No.1s: Phil Collins (2 shared No.1s)
NOTE: There were 4 Various Artist No. 1s this year (Band Aid, The Concerned, USA for Africa and The Crowd)

See also
1985 in music
Irish Singles Chart
List of artists who reached number one in Ireland

1985 in Irish music
1985 record charts
1985